Kandete is an administrative ward in the Busokelo District of the Mbeya Region of Tanzania. In 2016 the Tanzania National Bureau of Statistics report there were 11,334 people in the ward, from 10,284 in 2012.

Villages / vitongoji 
The ward has 6 villages and 22 vitongoji.

 Kandete
 Kalulu
 Lupanga
 Majengo
 Ipelo
 Ipyana
 Kabula
 Lugombo
 Nsika
 Mwela
 Kisiba
 Lusungo
 Mwela
 Sokoni
 Ndala
 Ipyela
 Katumba
 Kisimba
 Masebe
 Ntete
 Lugombo
 Ikama
 Itete
 Lugombo
 Bujingijila
 Bujingijila
 Ihobe
 Malambo

References

Wards of Mbeya Region